The Ford Falcon (XG) is a range of commercial vehicles which was manufactured by Ford Australia from 1993 to 1996. It was derived from the Ford Falcon (XF) full-size car.

Introduction 
The XG Falcon was introduced in March 1993 as a facelift of the XF commercial range, which it replaced. The XG was marketed in coupe utility and panel van body styles and during its three years in production it was sold alongside the EB Falcon, ED Falcon and EF Falcon sedan and wagon models.

The XG featured the XF Falcon-style body with a new front similar to that of the EB Falcon. An overhead camshaft engine, and a one-tonne option were offered for the first time on Falcon commercial models.

Model range 
The XG range included two-door coupe utility and two-door panel van body styles, marketed as follows.
 Ford Falcon Longreach GLi utility
 Ford Falcon Longreach GLi panel van
 Ford Falcon Longreach S utility
 Ford Falcon Longreach Outback utility (released June 1995)
 Ford Falcon XR6 utility (released October 1993)

A limited edition Longreach GLi Tradesman utility was offered from December 1995, with 800 examples produced.

Engine and transmissions 
The XG was powered by a 4.0-litre SOHC straight six  4.0-litre six cylinder overhead camshaft engine. The XR6 model was fitted with a  version of this unit. Five-speed manual and four-speed automatic transmissions were available.

60th Anniversary model ute 
In 1994 Ford produced a special limited edition model ute to commemorate the 60th Anniversary of the first coupe utility (introduced by Ford Australia in 1934).
It featured body coloured bumpers and mirrors, alloy bullbar, alloy wheels, floor carpet and full instrumentation at no extra cost.

Replacement 
The XG series was replaced by the Ford Falcon (XH) in April 1996.

Gallery

References 

XG
Cars of Australia
Cars introduced in 1993
XG Falcon
Coupé utilities
Vans
Rear-wheel-drive vehicles